The Badaghagara Waterfall is a waterfall of the Kendujhar district in the Indian state of Odisha.

Location
Badaghagara is located at a distance of 9 km from the district headquarters (Kendujhar) of Kendujhar district. Being a perennial source of water, a dam has constructed on the downstream side. It is situated at a distance of 3 kilometers on the downstream of Sanaghagara Waterfall.

The falls
It is a perennial waterfall.

See also
List of waterfalls in India
List of waterfalls in India by height

References 

  Badaghagara Waterfall of Odisha

External links
 Official page of Kendujhar district

Waterfalls of Odisha